Saket Gokhale is an Indian political activist and current spokesperson of Trinamool Congress (TMC). He joined TMC in 2021. He had also worked as a correspondent at the Financial Times, and at the Hindustan Times.

In December 2022, he was arrested over a tweet for posting alleged misinformation about 2022 Morbi bridge collapse. After getting bail from a metropolitan court in Ahmedabad, he was re-arrested over the same tweet in a matter of few hours. On 10 December, he was freed on bail.

In January 2023, Gokhale was arrested by the Enforcement Directorate (ED) for money laundering. ED found that Gokhale, who collected over 1 crore through crowdfunding for various campaigns, had diverted over half of the funds towards buying mutual funds for himself and refused to disclose the source of 24 lakh that he received in cash. ED told a special court in Ahmedabad that Gokhale had lost over 30 lakh in intraday trading in the stock market and used another 30 lakh for personal expenses including 6 lakh for purchasing liquor.

References

Living people
Trinamool Congress politicians
Year of birth missing (living people)